The Major League Baseball Comeback Player of the Year Award is presented by Major League Baseball (MLB) to the player who is judged to have "re-emerged on the baseball field during a given season." The award was developed in 2005, as part of a sponsorship agreement between MLB and Viagra. In 2005 and 2006 representatives from MLB and MLB.com selected six candidates each from the American (AL) and National Leagues (NL) and one winner for each league was selected via an online poll on MLB.com. Since then, the winners have been selected by a panel of MLB beat reporters. Under the current voting structure, first place votes are worth five points, second place votes worth three, and third place votes worth one with the award going to the player with the most points overall. Past winners have often overcome injury or personal problems en route to their award-winning season.

A Comeback Player of the Year Award has been given by The Sporting News since 1965 but its results are not officially recognized by Major League Baseball. Since the beginning of the MLB award in 2005, the recipients have been identical with the following exceptions: 2008 NL (TSN honored Fernando Tatís, MLB honored Brad Lidge), 2010 AL (TSN honored Vladimir Guerrero, MLB honored Francisco Liriano), 2012 AL (TSN honored Adam Dunn, MLB honored Fernando Rodney), 2016 (TSN honored Jose Fernandez and Mark Trumbo, MLB honored Anthony Rendon and Rick Porcello), 2018 NL (TSN honored Matt Kemp, MLB honored Jonny Venters), 2019 AL (TSN honored Hunter Pence, MLB honored Carlos Carrasco), and 2020 AL (TSN honored Carrasco, MLB honored Salvador Pérez). Liriano and Posey are the only players to win the MLB award multiple times with Liriano being the first to win it in each league.

Twelve players were named to the Major League Baseball All-Star team in their Comeback Award-winning season: Jim Thome, Nomar Garciaparra, Dmitri Young, Cliff Lee, Brad Lidge, Aaron Hill, Tim Hudson, Lance Berkman, Jacoby Ellsbury, Buster Posey, Fernando Rodney, and Mariano Rivera, with Posey also being named to the All-MLB Team. Two players who were not named to the All-Star team in their winning year—Jason Giambi and Ken Griffey Jr.—were named to the All-Star team in their previous season. Several winners have won other awards in their winning season. Carlos Peña, Posey, Ellsbury, Griffey and Hill won the Silver Slugger Award along with the Comeback Award. Posey won the NL MVP in his first comeback season. Lee won the Cy Young Award in his winning season and Lidge won both the Rolaids Relief Man Award and Delivery Man of the Year Award the same year. Rodney was also named Delivery Man of the Year in his comeback 2012 season. The most recent winners, announced in November 2022, are Albert Pujols from the NL and Justin Verlander from the AL.

American League winners

National League winners

See also

Players Choice Awards (includes Comeback Player)
Sporting News Comeback Player of the Year Award
Comeback Player of the Year Award (disambiguation), including similar awards in other sports

References

Comeback Player of the Year Award, MLB
Awards established in 2005